Ernesta Stern, born Maria Ernesta Hierschel de Minerbi, also known as Maria Star, (December 8, 1854 – 1926) was an Italian-born French author. She wrote many Venetian tales and novels. She held a salon in Paris and she was awarded the knighthood of the Legion of Honour. Her Villa Torre Clementina in Roquebrune-Cap-Martin is an official historical monument.

Early life
Ernesta Stern was born on December 8, 1854 in Trieste, Italy. Her father was Leone de Hierschel (son of Moisè Hierschel and Rachele Vivante) and her mother, Clementina de Minerbi (daughter of Caliman de Minerbi and Chiara di Angeli). She was Jewish.

Career
Stern wrote Venetian tales as well as novels. For example, her 1916 novel Le Baptême du courage is about World War I.

Stern held a salon in Paris. One of her guests was Italian poet Filippo Tommaso Marinetti. She was friends with Marcel Proust.

Stern became a knight of the Legion of Honour in 1920.

Personal life, death and legacy

Stern married Louis Stern, a banker and a member of the Stern family. They resided at 68 Rue du Faubourg Saint-Honoré in Paris. She was widowed in 1900, and she built the Villa Torre Clementina in Roquebrune-Cap-Martin in 1904.

Stern died in 1926. Her house in Roquebrune-Cap-Martin is listed as an official historical monument by the French Ministry of Culture.

Works

References

1854 births
1926 deaths
Writers from Trieste
Writers from Paris
People from Roquebrune-Cap-Martin
French women novelists
20th-century French novelists
Chevaliers of the Légion d'honneur
19th-century Italian Jews
Jewish women writers
20th-century French women writers
Stern family (banking)